The Party Crashers is a 1958 American drama film directed by Bernard Girard and written by Bernard Girard and Dan Lundberg. The film stars Mark Damon, Bobby Driscoll (in his last feature film role), Connie Stevens, Frances Farmer (in her last feature film role), Doris Dowling, and Gary Gray. The film was released in September 1958, by Paramount Pictures.

Plot
Barbara Nickerson and her upper-class boyfriend Josh Bickford are surprised at friend Stan Osgood's house when Twig Webster and his ill-mannered friends crash a private party there. Josh is appalled by Twig's behavior, but Barbara seems attracted to his animal magnetism.

John's conservative parents are concerned over his future. Twig, meanwhile, has an alcoholic mother, Hazel, who is abusive toward his father. At a party for adults, Twig finds his mother in a compromising position with another man. When they argue, she falls down a flight of stairs.

Twig becomes out of control, beating up Barbara, then also striking Josh when he tries to come to the girl's rescue. Barbara ends up hospitalized. Upon seeing their son's grief and also learning that Hazel has died, the Bickfords vow to become better parents to Josh.

Cast 
Mark Damon as Twig Webster
Bobby Driscoll as Josh Bickford
Connie Stevens as Barbara Nickerson
Frances Farmer as Mrs. Bickford
Doris Dowling as Mrs. Hazel Webster
Gary Gray as Don Hartlow
Robert Paget as Mumps Thornberg 
Skip Torgerson as Bill Leeds
Theodora Davitt as Sharon Lee 
Eugene Persson as Stan Osgood 
Denver Pyle as Ted Bickford
Walter Brooke as Mr. Webster
Cathy Lewis as Mrs. Nickerson
Joe Sonessa as Larry Bronsen
Onslow Stevens as Jim Nickerson
Jean Engstrom as May

References

External links 
 

1958 films
Paramount Pictures films
American drama films
1958 drama films
1950s English-language films
Films directed by Bernard Girard
1950s American films